The 2011 European Pairs Speedway Championship was the eighth edition of the European Pairs Speedway Championship. The final was held in  Piła, Poland on 17 September. Poland won their fourth title.

Calendar

Rules
Semi-Final 1: 3 pairs will qualify to the Final
Semi-Final 2: 3 pairs will qualify to the Final
The pair of Poland team will be allocated to the Final

Semifinal 1
  Miskolc
 July 14

Semifinal 2
  Berghaupten
 July 14

Final
  Pila
 September 17

See also 
 2011 Speedway European Championship

References 

2011
European Pairs